Stubienko  or Stibenets is a village in the administrative district of Gmina Stubno, within Przemyśl County, Subcarpathian Voivodeship, in south-eastern Poland, close to the border with Ukraine.

History 
Until 1772 the village was part of Przemyśl County, Ruthenian Voivodeship.

In 1880 the village belonged to Przemyśl county of the Kingdom of Galicia and Lodomeria of the Austro-Hungarian Empire, the village had 107 houses and 564 inhabitants. 

In the years 1934-1939. the village belonged to the gmina of Stubno, Przemyśl County, Lviv Voivodeship.  On September 12, 1939, the village was occupied by the German army, but according to the Ribbentrop-Molotov agreement in late September 1939, the village was transferred to the Red Army. On 27.11.1939, by the resolution of the Presidium of the Supreme Soviet of the Ukrainian SSR, the village within the county was included in the newly formed Drohobych region, and on January 17, 1940 — in the Medicovsky district.

In June 1941, with the beginning of the Soviet-German war, the village was occupied by the Germans. In July 1944, Soviet troops captured the village.

In 1975-1998 the village belonged to Przemyśl Voivodeship.

Demographics

Historic national composition 
1785 (493 residents)
 Ukrainians: 314 (63.7%)
 Poles: 166 (33.7%)
 Jews: 13 (2.6%)
 1880 (564 residents)
 Ukrainians: 513 people (91%)
 Poles 66 people (11.7%)
 Jews 35 people (6.2%)
 1939 (760 residents)
 Ukrainians: 705 (92.7%)
 Jews: 50 (6.6%)
 Poles: (0.66%)

References

Stubienko